Hypsopygia violaceomarginalis is a species of snout moth in the genus Hypsopygia. It was described by Aristide Caradja in 1935. It is found in China.

References

Moths described in 1935
Pyralini
Taxa named by Aristide Caradja